Raymond Coulon (19 October 1910 – 4 February 2007) was a French sculptor. His work was part of the sculpture event in the art competition at the 1948 Summer Olympics.

References

1910 births
2007 deaths
20th-century French sculptors
20th-century French male artists
French male sculptors
Olympic competitors in art competitions
People from Puy-de-Dôme